Thomas Merritt may refer to:

 Thomas Merritt (composer) (1863–1908), organist and composer of Christmas carols
 Thomas Rodman Merritt (1824–1906), businessman and political figure in Upper Canada, later Ontario
 Tom Merritt (born 1970), technology journalist, writer, and broadcaster
 Tom Merritt (politician) (1911–1991), member of the Illinois Senate 
 Tommy Merritt (born 1948), member of the Texas House of Representatives